The 1942-43 French Rugby Union Championship was won by Bayonne that beat  Agen in the final..

After three seasons of non official competitions, the FFR made the decision on 5 June 1942, to restart to play the championship.

At the championship participated:

 40 teams from German Army occupation zone
 55 teams from France not occupied.

After the occupation of the second zone by the German Army, in November, the FFR changed the denominations in "Zone North" and "Zone South".

The final was played by the winners of the two zone

Context 

The "Coupe de France" was won by le Agen that beat SBUC in the final.

Quarterfinals 

 Zone North:

 Zone South:

Semifinals

Final

External links 
 Compte rendu de la finale de 1943, sur lnr.fr

1943
France
Championship